The Hinemaiaia Stream is a river of the central North Island of  New Zealand. It flows northwest from Kaimanawa Forest Park, flowing into the eastern shore of Lake Taupo at Hatepe, halfway between Taupo and Turangi. It is a popular Fly fishing stream with good numbers of Rainbow trout spawning in the winter months of June through to September.

See also
List of rivers of New Zealand

References

External links 
 Trustpower Hinemaiaia hydroelectricity generating stations.

Taupō District
Rivers of Waikato
Rivers of New Zealand